NML may refer to:

 Fort McMurray/Mildred Lake Airport (IATA code: NML), an airport in Canada
 Neue Marx-Lektüre, "New Marx Reading", a contemporary form of Marxism and critique of political economy.
 National Medical Library, an Indian medical library established in 1966
 National Metallurgical Laboratory, an Indian research center
 National Microbiology Laboratory, a Canadian research institute
 National Museum of Language, an American literary museum
 National Museums Liverpool, a British charity
 National Music League, an American arts organization
 New.Music.Live., a MuchMusic television series
 New Melones Lake, an American artificial lake
 NML Capital Limited, a hedge fund owned by Paul Singer (businessman)
 No More Landmines, a British mine clearance organization
 Norm Macdonald Live, a Canadian podcast
 Northwestern Mutual Life Insurance Company, an American financial services mutual organization based in Milwaukee
 Not My Life, a 2011 American documentary film
 Nowe Miasto Lubawskie, Poland

See also
No Man's Land (disambiguation)
 nml, ISO 639 code for the Ndemli language of Cameroon